Alchevsk (translit. Alchevs'k) is a city of significance in the Luhansk Oblast of Ukraine. Population: 

Alchevsk is one of the largest industrial centers in the Donbas, and comprises a quarter of the entire oblast's production. The city economy depends on OJSC "Alchevsk Iron & Steel Works" (a trade blockade by Ukrainian activists during the war in Donbas has all but halted production of this plant in February 2017) and "Alchevsk Coke-Chemical Plant" companies.

The city was known as Voroshylovsk from 1931 to 1961, and then Kommunarsk until 1991. Alchevsk came under control of pro-Russian separatists in early 2014, and was incorporated into the Lugansk People's Republic. After the 2022 annexation referendums in Russian-occupied Ukraine, Russia claimed the city as part of Russia.

History

 
Alchevsk was founded in 1895 with the establishment of an iron works and named after the Russian industrialist Oleksiy Alchevsky who founded the Donetsk–Yuryev Metallurgical Society.

A local newspaper is published in the city since 1930.

In 1931, Alchevsk was renamed Voroshilovsk, after Kliment Voroshilov, a Soviet military and party figure.

During World War II, in 1942–1943, the German occupiers operated a Gestapo prison in the city.

As Voroshilov's personality cult was diminishing, the town was renamed Kommunarsk in 1961. After the dissolution of the Soviet Union, the original name was restored in 1992.

Winter disaster of 2006
On 22 January 2006 the district heating system of the city almost entirely collapsed after an underground heat pipe line cracked in unusually cold weather (nearly ). As a result, heating equipment in the majority of Alchevsk's buildings was frozen and ruptured, leaving about 60,000 residents with only the protection of individual electric heaters. A few days later the sewage system also froze due to a lack of warm tap water.

An investigation revealed the massive, long-time negligence of the city authorities. The whole heating system was designed in a hyper-centralized way, depending on only two boilers and few main pipelines. Moreover, the housing company failed to react to the pipe incident properly: the water from the system wasn't immediately dumped to prevent further freezing.

The Ukrainian government took massive emergency actions to protect Alchevsk residents from freezing. Engineering teams sent by cities and industrial companies from other regions of the country were gradually restoring heating appliances in every apartment affected.  Hundreds of children together with their schoolteachers were evacuated to the resorts and hotels in the warmer regions of Ukraine. According to the governor of Luhansk Oblast G. Moskal, it has been the worst human-made disaster in the history of independent Ukraine.

War in Donbas (2014–present)
Starting mid-April 2014, pro-Russian separatists captured and occupied several towns in the Luhansk Oblast, including Alchevsk. In the following war in Donbas, the city became a part of the self-proclaimed Luhansk People's Republic.

Economy 
The main branches of Alchevsk industry – metallurgical and chemical.  Electromechanical, light and food industry is also developed. Currently the city has 17 industrial enterprises.

Demographics
As of the Ukrainian Census of 2001:

Ethnicity
Russians: 51.6%
Ukrainians: 44.7%
Belarusians: 1.1%

Language
Russian: 83.6%
Ukrainian: 15.3%
Belarusian: 0.1%
Armenian: 0.1%
Romani: 0.1%

Education
The Donbas State Technical University, founded in 1957, is located in Alchevsk.

Sports

Alchevsk is home to the football team FC Stal Alchevsk which currently participates in the Ukrainian First League, the second tier of national football competitions.

Twin towns and sister cities

Alchevsk is twinned with:
 Dąbrowa Górnicza, Poland
 Dunaújváros, Hungary

References

Sources
Ye. M. Pospelov. "Имена городов: вчера и сегодня (1917–1992). Топонимический словарь." (City Names: Yesterday and Today (1917–1992). Toponymic Dictionary.) Москва, "Русские словари", 1993.

External links
Official site of town authorities
Unofficial town page
Another unofficial town page
Alchevsk winter disaster page
Map of Alchevsk

 
Cities in Luhansk Oblast
Populated places established in 1895
Yekaterinoslav Governorate
Cities of regional significance in Ukraine
1895 establishments in the Russian Empire
Populated places established in the Russian Empire
City name changes in Ukraine
Former Soviet toponymy in Ukraine